The 1949 New York Yankees season was the team's 47th season. The team finished with a record of 97–57, winning their 16th pennant, finishing 1 game ahead of the Boston Red Sox. New York was managed by Casey Stengel in his first year. The Yankees played their home games at Yankee Stadium. In the World Series, they defeated the Brooklyn Dodgers in 5 games.

Offseason
 November 15, 1948: Grant Dunlap was drafted by the Yankees from the Cleveland Indians in the 1948 minor league draft.
 Prior to 1949 season: Lou Skizas was signed as an amateur free agent by the Yankees.

Regular season
The 1949 Yankees team was seen as "underdogs" who came from behind to catch and surprise the powerful Red Sox on the last two days of the season, a face off that fueled the beginning of the modern Yankees – Red Sox rivalry.

The Red Sox needed just one win in two games and were to pitch Mel Parnell in the first game. After trailing 4–0, the Yankees came back to beat Parnell 5–4, as Johnny Lindell hit an eighth-inning, game-winning, home run and Joe Page had a great relief appearance for New York. And so it came down to the last game of the season. It was Ellis Kinder facing Vic Raschi.

The Yankees led 1–0 after seven innings, having scored in the first. In the eighth inning, manager Joe McCarthy lifted Kinder for a pinch hitter who did not come through. Then he brought in Mel Parnell in relief, and Parnell yielded a homer to Tommy Henrich and a single to Yogi Berra. Parnell was replaced by Tex Hughson, who had been on the disabled list and said his arm still hurt. But he came on and, with the bases loaded, Jerry Coleman hit a soft liner that Al Zarilla in right field tried to make a shoestring catch, but he missed and it went for a triple and three runs scored. In the ninth inning the Red Sox rallied for three runs but still fell short. The post-season proved to be a bit easier, as the Yankees defeated the Brooklyn Dodgers four games to one.

In 1949, Boston Red Sox owner Tom Yawkey and Yankees GM Larry MacPhail verbally agreed to trade DiMaggio for Ted Williams, but MacPhail refused to include Yogi Berra. Phil Rizzuto moved from eighth to first in the batting lineup and finished the season second in voting for the American League MVP Award.

Season standings

Record vs. opponents

Notable transactions
 April 28, 1949: Grant Dunlap was returned by the Yankees to the Indians.

Roster

Player stats

Batting

Starters by position
Note: Pos = Position; G = Games played; AB = At bats; H = Hits; Avg. = Batting average; HR = Home runs; RBI = Runs batted in

Other batters
Note: G = Games played; AB = At bats; H = Hits; Avg. = Batting average; HR = Home runs; RBI = Runs batted in

Pitching

Starting pitchers
Note: G = Games pitched; IP = Innings pitched; W = Wins; L = Losses; ERA = Earned run average; SO = Strikeouts

Other pitchers
Note: G = Games pitched; IP = Innings pitched; W = Wins; L = Losses; ERA = Earned run average; SO = Strikeouts

Relief pitchers
Note: G = Games pitched; W = Wins; L = Losses; SV = Saves; ERA = Earned run average; SO = Strikeouts

1949 World Series 

AL New York Yankees (4) vs. NL Brooklyn Dodgers (1)

Awards and honors
 Joe Page, Babe Ruth Award
All-Star Game

Farm system

Notes

References
1949 New York Yankees at Baseball Reference
1949 World Series
1949 New York Yankees team page at www.baseball-almanac.com

New York Yankees seasons
New York Yankees
New York Yankees
1940s in the Bronx
American League champion seasons
World Series champion seasons